Leslie Cagan is an American activist, writer, and socialist organizer involved with the peace and social justice movements. She is the former national coordinator of United for Peace and Justice, the former co-chair of Committees of Correspondence for Democracy and Socialism, and the former chair of Pacifica Radio.

Early life 
Cagan was born in 1947 to a Jewish couple in The Bronx, New York City, in what she described as a "red diaper" family.  She attended her first political rally as a young child in the 1950s, accompanied by her parents, who were former members of the Communist Party.  Her grandmother, a seamstress, was a founding member of the Amalgamated Clothing Workers Union.  She graduated from New York University in 1968 with a degree in art history.

Career 
In 1969, Cagan was among the first participants of the Venceremos Brigade, groups of young adults who visited Cuba under the auspices of harvesting sugar cane.  During her journey to Havana, Cagan told an Associated Press reporter: "All of us support the Cuban Revolution and feel that by going and working with the Cubans we can show that support."

After choosing to skip graduate school, Cagan began her lifetime career of promoting various causes, predominantly in the anti-war movement, the anti-nuclear movement, the LGBT rights movement, the feminist movement, and normalization of relations with Cuba.  Cagan has been described by The New York Times as one of the "grandes dames of the country's progressive movement" and a "national figure in the antiwar movement."

During the late 1960s–early 1970s, Cagan was actively involved with the Black Panther Party.  Cagan has protested the incarceration of Mumia Abu-Jamal, a Black Panther Party member convicted and sentenced to death for the 1981 murder of police officer Daniel Faulkner.

On June 12, 1982, Cagan was a lead organizer of the anti-nuclear rally held in New York City, attended by hundreds of thousands of activists.  She was co-chair of the 1987 protest for gay and lesbian rights.

In 2002, Cagan was among the founders of United for Peace and Justice, a left-wing coalition of more than 1,300 international and U.S.-based organizations opposed to what they describe as "our government's policy of permanent warfare and empire-building."  The organization was founded in the months preceding the 2003 invasion of Iraq.  An opponent of military intervention, Cagan is strongly opposed to U.S. military forces staying in Iraq.  Her view of Iraqi insurgents fighting U.S.-led coalition forces: "What I do think is legitimate is that people who are being occupied would find a way to work against that occupation. If you call that an insurgency, then so be it."  In regards to U.S. relations with Israel, Cagan had described U.S. funds as going "to help maintain the deadly Israeli occupation of Palestinian territories."

Cagan co-founded the Committees of Correspondence for Democracy and Socialism, a socialist group that left the Communist Party, following the dissolution of the Soviet Union.  In 1997, she was an organizer for the 14th annual World Festival of Youth and Students.  Cagan is a member of the New York Committee to Free the Cuban Five, an advocacy group seeking the release of five Cubans convicted in 2001 of spying on Cuban American exiles and U.S. military bases for Fidel Castro.  In reference to peace activism, Cagan has said, "We have so much to learn from the history of the Communist Party about how this work has been done."

In 2004, Cagan was included in Out magazine's annual list of the 100 most influential LGBT people.  She lives in Brooklyn, New York, with her partner, author and activist Melanie Kaye/Kantrowitz (d. 2018), founding director of Jews for Racial & Economic Justice.

Works

References

External links 
 Leslie Cagan Papers, by the Tamiment Library and Robert F. Wagner Archives
 Archive of commentary by Leslie Cagan, by Z Magazine
 Video interview with Leslie Cagan, featured on the 2004 documentary film, Waging Peace
 Audio speech by Leslie Cagan, following the 2008 U.S. presidential election
 Video speech by Leslie Cagan, via Free Speech TV
 Audio interview with Leslie Cagan, by WBAI's Beyond The Pale

1947 births
Living people
20th-century American non-fiction writers
20th-century American women writers
21st-century American non-fiction writers
21st-century American women writers
Activists from New York (state)
American anti–Iraq War activists
American anti–nuclear weapons activists
American anti–Vietnam War activists
American anti-war activists
American campaign managers
American civil rights activists
American feminist writers
Jewish American community activists
American political writers
American abortion-rights activists
American socialists
Anti-corporate activists
Jewish American writers
Jewish feminists
Jewish socialists
Jewish women writers
American lesbian writers
American LGBT rights activists
LGBT Jews
New York (state) socialists
New York University alumni
People from the Bronx
Writers from Brooklyn
American women non-fiction writers
LGBT people from New York (state)
American socialist feminists